Cyberjaya (a portmanteau of cyber and Putrajaya) is a city with a science park as the core that forms a key part of the Multimedia Super Corridor in Malaysia. It is located in Sepang District, Selangor. Cyberjaya is adjacent to, and developed along with Putrajaya, Malaysia's government seat. This city aspires to be known as the Silicon Valley of Malaysia.

The official opening ceremony for Cyberjaya was held on 17 May 1997 by the Prime Minister, Mahathir bin Mohamad.

Many multinational companies and data centres are located in the city.

History

Until 1975, what is today Cyberjaya, Putrajaya and Dengkil were under the administration of Hulu Langat (Kajang) district. On the site of today's Cyberjaya once stood an estate, Prang Besar (Great War).

The idea of an IT-themed city, Cyberjaya, arose out of a study by management consultancy McKinsey for the Multimedia Super Corridor commissioned by the Federal Government of Malaysia in 1995. The implementation agency was the Town & Country Planning Department of the Ministry of Housing and Local Government. The catalyst is the agreement by NTT in 1996 to site an R&D centre at a site to the west of the new Malaysian administration centre, Putrajaya.

Multimedia Development Corporation (then known as MDC), the agency overseeing the implementation of the MSC was located in Cyberjaya to oversee the creation. The real estate implementation was privatised to Cyberview Sdn Bhd (Cyberview) in early 1997. At the time, Cyberview was set up a joint-venture comprising entities such as Setia Haruman Sdn Bhd (SHSB), Nippon Telephone and Telegraph (NTT), Golden Hope, MDeC, Permodalan Nasional Berhad (PNB) and Kumpulan Darul Ehsan Berhad (KDEB), representative of the Selangor Government. SHSB, a consortium comprising Renong, Landmarks, MKLand and Country Heights, was asked to take the lead regarding the development. Federal government-linked companies Telekom Malaysia and Tenaga Nasional were conscripted to provide the telecommunication and power supply infrastructure. The ambitious plan was to develop the first phase, comprising 1,430 hectares by 2006, with the remaining 1,460 hectares to be developed after the year 2011. The engineering management consultant, Pengurusan Lebuhraya Bhd (now acquired by Opus International Malaysia) was appointed to manage the construction of utilities and infrastructure, overseeing major construction firms of Peremba and United Engineers Malaysia (UEM).

However, due to the late 1997 Asian Financial Crisis, the undertaking was deemed no longer viable and necessitated the Government taking over of the 55% and 15% stake in Cyberview shares held by SHSB and NTT respectively via the Ministry of Finance Inc. (MOF Inc.). The transaction gave MOF Inc a 70% stake, and Cyberview has remained a government-owned company ever since. Cyberview then entered into an agreement with SHSB with shareholders comprising Country Heights Holdings Berhad (CHHB), Landmarks, Menara Embun (an MKLand Controlled Company) and Renong (now UEM World) with equal shares of 25%; granting SHSB the right to develop Cyberjaya as the master developer, while Cyberview became the landowner. In 2004, CHHB and Landmarks sold their equity interest in SHSB to MKLand-controlled companies, namely Modern Eden (12.5%), Impressive Circuits (12.5%) and Virtual Path (25%), resulting in MKLand-controlled companies becoming the majority shareholder of SHSB.

Cyberview's role grew to include implementing various development and government initiatives, while SHSB carried on its role as the master developer. In addition to this, Cyberview was also tasked to undertake citywide maintenance and spearhead investor interface and community-centric programmes in Cyberjaya.

In 2014, efforts went underway to reposition Cyberjaya from Malaysia's first cybercity to a global technology hub.

Physical development

Spanning about 28.94 square kilometres (7,000 acres), the city is the nucleus of the Multimedia Super Corridor (MSC), now known as MSC Malaysia. The site for Cyberjaya was primarily undeveloped land consisting of oil palm plantations. It has since seen extensive building activities, including a boutique hotel, numerous commercial buildings, offices for MSC Status companies, universities, a community club, and the local council's headquarters.

It was built as a future city, but no goals toward this end have been announced. The Multimedia Development Corporation (MDeC) (formerly MDC), the agency tasked with spearheading the MSC's progress, has its headquarters in the heart of Cyberjaya.

Setia Haruman also undertakes to install properties such as office buildings, retail space and apartment suites to meet the market's demand. Apart from being a Master Developer of Cyberjaya, Setia Haruman also wears the hat as a Property Developer and has constructed commercial, residential and enterprise buildings to meet the thriving community's demands in Cyberjaya.

Office and commercial facilities
Many companies who qualify for MSC incentives have relocated their operations to Cyberjaya. Among them are:

 Huawei
 T-Systems
 Dell
 DHL
 Tech Mahindra
 Wipro
 HSBC
 OCBC
 BMW
 IBM
 Monster.com 

Over 500 MSC Status companies have currently located their operations here, making the township a rapidly growing area.

MKN Embassy Development Sdn develops the project. Bhd., a joint venture company between EMKAY Group of Malaysia and Embassy Group of India, is a strategic partner for EMKAY Group in the development of this specialised ICT building.

Education facilities

Multimedia University is one of the higher education institutions and an early component of Cyberjaya. The Cyberjaya campus was opened on 8 July 1999. The university's enrolment in Cyberjaya is about 20,277 students. Approximately 19% of these are international students from 80 countries. Faculty departments include Engineering, Information Technology, Creative Multimedia and Management. This campus was the brainchild of the country's fourth prime minister, Tun Dr Mahathir Mohamad, as a centre of learning and research for the Multimedia Super Corridor (MSC), a 750 km2 area designated as the country's high-tech research and industrial area.

Other higher education institutions in Cyberjaya are Limkokwing University of Creative Technology, University Malaysia of Computer Science & Engineering (UNIMY), University of Cyberjaya, Universiti Islam Malaysia (UIM), Cyber Putra College and Kirkby International College.

There is a Sekolah Seri Puteri which is a National Secondary Full Boarding School for girls.

To cater for school children of the general population of Cyberjaya, there are primary (Sekolah Kebangsaan Cyberjaya and also SJK (C) union Chinese primary school shift from Ulu Sepetang) and secondary (Sekolah Menengah Kebangsaan Cyberjaya) public schools. The student population is about 350 and 750 for the primary and the secondary schools, respectively.

The Korean expatriate population of the Kuala Lumpur area is served by the Korean School of Malaysia in Cyberjaya.

Public facilities

As an emerging township, Cyberjaya now has a police station complex, and a fire station (Bomba). Apart from that, other public amenities which are completed includes a small recreational park just next to Multimedia University, the Cyberjaya Community Club, the Sports Arena (which offers outdoor sports facilities), bus shelters, pedestrian walkways and signalised pedestrian crossing at road junctions and more than 700 parking bays.

The Raja Haji Fisabilillah Mosque is a principal mosque in Cyberjaya, and another newly built mosque is located at Masreca19 area, called Cyber10 Mosque.

Recreation facilities

Parks
The Cyberjaya Lake Gardens is a  'green lung' for Cyberjaya. The Lake Gardens is now gaining popularity amongst the local community. Many community events, including fishing competitions, have attracted thousands to this lake. In September 2007, the Cyberjaya 50th Merdeka Carnival Celebration attracted more than 4,000 anglers, and it was registered as the biggest fishing competition by the Malaysia Book of Records.

Other outdoor recreational facilities include the mini-park, adjacent to the Multimedia University; the 3.5 km promenade area next to the Putrajaya Lake; and the Sports Arena which offers more than 360 free parking bays, 1 basketball court, 1 tennis court, 2 futsal courts, a football field and a small food court.

For indoor recreational facilities, the Cyberjaya Community Club, developed by Cyberview, has 2 futsal courts, 2 badminton courts, a gymnasium and 2 squash courts; all indoor and outdoor recreational facilities including basketball court, 2 tennis courts, swimming pool, a go-kart circuit and golf driving range.

Nightlife

The city has several bars and restaurants, including Japanese food options. The latest addition is Live Style Mall - The Tamarind Square.

Transportation

Car
The completion of the KL–Putrajaya Highway (MEX Highway)  in December 2007 has cut short the travel time by car from Kuala Lumpur to Cyberjaya to 20 minutes. The KL–Putrajaya Highway was meant to be a shortcut for motorists from downtown Kuala Lumpur and other places along its alignment to get to Kuala Lumpur International Airport in 30 minutes. The highway which ends at the Putrajaya Utama toll plaza links up to the Elite Highway  which will then give motorists only another 10 minutes to get to the airport. Drivers have a toll-free alternative route with the Selangor State Route B15 extension that passes through Dengkil and Bandar Baru Salak Tinggi. The SKVE  serves as a shortcut to Port Klang.

Public transportation

The KLIA Transit, on the Express Rail Link (airport train) network, is the only railway line serving Cyberjaya and the adjacent Putrajaya. In fact, the two towns share one railway station - the Putrajaya/Cyberjaya ERL station . The Phase Two of MRT Putrajaya Line which is expected to be operational by January 2023 will have two MRT stations serving Cyberjaya namely the  Cyberjaya Utara and  Cyberjaya City Centre stations. The ERL station, alternately known as Putrajaya Sentral, also serves as a transportation hub which provides conventional bus routes from Bandar Utama and Puchong as well  KTM Serdang and Kuala Lumpur.

With the opening of Putrajaya line from 16 March 2023, the MRT feeder bus routes  &  from  Cyberjaya Utara station (serving Cyber 4, 9, 11, Hospital Cyberjaya and Taman Pinggiran Cyber), as well  &  from  Cyberjaya City Centre station (serving the entire Cyberjaya except Cyber 11 and Setia Eco Glades) is now available. The free Smart Selangor MPSepang bus  is also available to serve Cyberjaya from Bandar Baru Salak Tinggi and Dengkil. In addition, a bus sharing on-demand service known as Kumpool is available in Cyberjaya since August 2022. 

Previously Cyberjaya is served by a feeder bus by Nadi Putra (before revamp) from Putrajaya Sentral to Cyberjaya, as well by Causeway Link from Putrajaya Sentral to Taman Putra Perdana via Cyberjaya. These buses are not timed to match the train services' timing and the buses' fare increase to RM 2 for each trip. However, the service is frequent, but reliability and safety are concerning at times. Strikes by Nadi Putra bus drivers broke out in 2007 and 2018.
 
To improve transportation within the town, Cyberview has launched a free park and ride system, a viable alternative for those wishing to park at the designated areas in Cyberjaya and commuting to areas of the city.

Cyberjaya features a single bus terminal, known as the Cyberjaya Transport Terminal for Cyberjaya's own Dedicated Transportation System. It was used to provide bus routes connecting Cyberjaya to Ampang, Gombak, Bandar Tasik Selatan, Bandar Utama, Kepong, Shah Alam and Klang. However the service have ceased operations since September 2021.
Taxis are available at the terminal.

Bicycle and scooter sharing service is being offered by Tryke to solve last-mile commute. Hybrid bicycles and e-scooters are available for rental through smart phone application from several locations throughout the city, enabling connections from residential areas to offices, commercial centres, and parks.

Residential areas
High rise residential and integrated developments include Cristal Serin Residence, Shaftsbury Square, D'Pulze, Serin Residency, Cybersquare, Crystal, The Place, Pangea, Arc, D'Melor, Domain, Cyberia smart homes, Masreca19, etc. Landed housing includes Sejati Residences, Symphony Hills, Garden Residence, Summer Glades, Mirage by the Lake, Taman Pinggiran Cyber and Setia Eco Glades. With the many upcoming developments, there will be at least an additional 10,000 residential units in the next two years. Its perceived Garden Residence, Cyberjaya, is the most strategic landed properties in Cyberjaya due to its proximity to SkyPark, Cyberjaya City Centre and IOI Resort City Mall. The upcoming development around Garden Residence Cyberjaya will be two stop-over stations of MRT line 2 and another RM15 billion worth of developments over the next five years in Cyberjaya City Center.

Population

The day-time population in Cyberjaya is about 140,000 and expected to increase to 350,000 by 2039.

Communications
To support the aspiration to host multimedia industries, Cyberjaya was specified with extensive and intensive fibre optic cabling. As Malaysia's premier IT hub, Cyberjaya has a telecommunication backbone running primarily on fibre optics known as Cyberjaya Metro Fibre Network (CMFN). Operated by Allo Technology Sdn Bhd (formerly known as Setia Haruman Technology Sdn Bhd). CMFN is a carrier-neutral and open-access infrastructure where multi-leading Telco/Carriers/ISPs are riding on CMFN's fibre optic network to provide their services to end customers in Cyberjaya. CMFN delivers fibre connectivity straight to the building under the concepts of "Fibre-To-The-Building (FTTB)" and "Fibre-To-The-Home (FTTH)". As such, most of the commercial buildings and offices are connected to CMFN. With the ring topology; CMFN offers full redundancy throughout the network – with the availability of high capacity and resiliency network, many data centres are located here and connected to CMFN. However, some older commercial and residential units still use copper lines to provide "last mile" access to customers. Broadband access covering wireless and fixed-line is readily available. Broadband access is serviced primarily by Cyberjaya Broadband (City Broadband), Time, TMnet, NTT MSC.

Backup electrical supply
The Cyberjaya planning guidelines strongly required two electrical connections from two separate substations. Diesel generators up to full load (except air conditioning load) were specified to be installed in all commercial buildings. The electricity grid connection was also organised to enable "power islanding" and supported by the Serdang Power Station. The electricity service standard is set at 99.99% availability with a maximum of 10 seconds interruption for office and commercial areas and maximum 15 minutes interruption for residential areas. These measures were dreamed up to provide Cyberjaya with a comparative advantage against other Multimedia Super Corridor areas. However, Tenaga Nasional has extended the same standard to all urban areas connected to the National Grid in Malaysia.

District cooling 
The use of district cooling system, where chilled water from a central plant is provided to run the air conditioning, was laid extensively in the central district. The promise is the economical use of off-peak electricity at night to chill water for air conditioning use during the day. Pendinginan Megajana Sdn Bhd, a subsidiary of Cyberview, is the provider for this service.

Data centres
Several data centres operate in Cyberjaya. Notable are those operated by T-Systems for Shell, NTT MSC, BMW and DHL. A small scale Data Centre ideal for Small & Medium Enterprises (SMEs) is located at City Command Center Cyberjaya (CCC) Data Centre that provides Rack Location Unit (RLU) space rental and server co-location. There are also carrier-neutral, purpose-built high-end data centre facilities in Cyberjaya such as CX1, CX2 and CX5 – managed by CSF Advisers (a CSF Group member) plc CSF Group), Basis Bay and MyTelehaus. There are also few government agencies' purpose-built data centre facilities in Cyberjaya, such as Central Bank (Bank Negara Malaysia) and the Road Transport Department. Malaysia's incumbent Telco, Telekom Malaysia (TM) also has its purpose-built data centre facilities in Cyberjaya.

Call centres
Several call centres & service desk operate in Cyberjaya. Notables are those operated by HP, IBM, HSBC.

Office space
Initially, 8 blocks of office buildings were built by the developer. These are purpose-built for multimedia companies by being provided extra height ceiling and underfloor trunking (some with raised floor), fibre optic wiring, dual redundant power supply, uninterruptible power supply and back up generators for whole electricity load, which common practice in Malaysia is only to 30% load.

Presently, there are more than 30 completed office buildings in Cyberjaya catering for multi-tenants and single tenants. Government agencies' presence will also increase once the Bank Negara Data Centre and Road and Transport Department's IT Centre buildings are completed.

This city is also looking forward to developing the Knowledge Workers Development Institute (KWDI) and the Creative Multimedia Cluster, both by Cyberview, which are targeted for completion in 2009.

MKN Embassy Development Sdn develops the project. Bhd., a joint venture company between EMKAY Group of Malaysia and Embassy Group of India, is a strategic partner for the EMKAY group in developing this specialised ICT building.

Cyberjaya-TV
Cyberjaya-TV was conceived in late 2009 to showcase Cyberjaya's "Live, Study, Work & Play" elements.  Contents developed, primarily, relate to Cyberjaya, which provides a means for people worldwide to sample part of the thriving Cyberjaya community.
Cyberjaya TV no longer operating.

Education

Cyberjaya plays host to many schools, colleges and universities.  These include Sekolah Menengah Kebangsaan Cyberjaya, King Henry VIII College, ELC International School, Multimedia University (MMU), Kirkby International College, University of Cyberjaya (UoC), FTMS College and LimKokWing University of Creative Technology (LUCT).

Government and infrastructure
Cyberjaya hosts a number of government agencies head offices and branches:

 Malaysian Qualifications Agency (MQA) - Jalan Teknokrat 7
 Malaysian Communications and Multimedia Commission (MCMC) - MCMC Tower 1, Jalan Impact, Cyber 6
 Lembaga Hasil Dalam Negeri (LHDN) - Persiaran Rimba Permai, Cyber 8
Malaysian Public Service Department (JPA), Kumpulan Wang Persaraan - MKN Embassy Techzone, Jalan Teknokrat 2
Ministry of Education, Education Sponsorship Department - Jalan Usahawan 1
Ministry of Human Resource, Jabatan Tenaga Kerja - Jalan Teknokrat 3
Sepang Municipal Council (MPS) - Persiaran Semarak Api, Cyber 1

In popular culture 
Cyberaya is a fictional city in the Malaysian animation series, Ejen Ali, inspired from Cyberjaya, where is Cyberaya shown to be a technologically advanced city, much as the real-life Cyberjaya had envisioned.

See also
 MSC Cyberport
 Technology Park Malaysia
 List of technology centers
 Kirkby International College
 Sekolah Menengah Kebangsaan Cyberjaya
 
 
 Cyberabad, Telangana, India

References

External links 

Cyberjaya Malaysia - Global Tech Hub (Official Website)
Intelligent city gets residents’ thumbs up, The Star, 25 November 2006 
Government moves to recover RM242 million from InventQjaya Sdn Bhd, The Star, 8 July 2006 
CSF Group, South East Asia's Largest Carrier Neutral High-End Purpose Built Data Center

MSC Malaysia
Sepang District
High-technology business districts in Malaysia
Information technology places
Science parks in Malaysia
1997 establishments in Malaysia
Populated places established in 1997
Planned cities in Malaysia
Towns in Selangor